John Fothergill (born in 1953 in Malta) is pro-vice-chancellor of City University London. He was formerly head of engineering, dean of science and pro-vice-chancellor at the University of Leicester. He is a Fellow of the IEEE, the IEE, and the Institute of Physics.

He has over 120 refereed papers and over 20 postgraduate students

Early life and education
John Charles Fothergill was born in Malta. He lived in London and in Fish Hoek South Africa before settling in Iver Heath at the age of 10.  He attended Slough Grammar School (now Upton Court Grammar School) and won prizes in Music and Mathematics. He graduated from the University College of North Wales (now Bangor University) with a BSc (Hons) in Electronic Engineering (1975), an MSc in Electronic Materials and Devices (1976), and a PhD in the Dielectric Properties of Biopolymers (1980) which he studied with Profs Ron Pethig and John Lewis.

Career
He worked at the Standard Telecommunication Laboratories from 1979 to 1984 as a senior research engineer on high-voltage power cables.

In 1984, he moved to the University of Leicester as a lecturer. He was promoted to professor in 2000 and was head of the Electrical Power and Power Electronics Research Group, dean of science, pro vice-chancellor (learning and teaching), and head of the Department of Engineering.  He remains an honorary visiting professor at the University of Leicester.

In 2012, he became pro vice-chancellor (research and enterprise) at City University London.

He is a visiting professor at the Three Gorges University and Taiyuan University of Technology, China.

External References
 http://www.city.ac.uk/news/2012/apr/professor-john-fothergill-appointed-pro-vice-chancellor-at-city-university-london
 http://www2.le.ac.uk/staff/community/people/staffupdates/professor-john-fothergill
 https://web.archive.org/web/20070610121926/http://www.le.ac.uk/engineering/research/groups/power/staff/fothergill.html
 https://web.archive.org/web/20130624071948/http://johnfothergill.co.uk/

References

1953 births
Maltese emigrants to the United Kingdom
People from Slough
People educated at Upton Court Grammar School
Alumni of Bangor University
Academics of the University of Leicester
Fellows of the Institute of Physics
Fellow Members of the IEEE
English engineers
Living people
Vice-Chancellors of the University of Leicester